Friedrich Paulsen (July 16, 1846 – August 14, 1908) was a German Neo-Kantian philosopher and educator.

Biography
He was born at Langenhorn (Schleswig) and educated at the Gymnasium Christianeum, the University of Erlangen, and the University of Berlin. He completed his doctoral thesis under Friedrich Adolf Trendelenburg at Berlin in 1871, he habilitated there in 1875, and he became extraordinary professor of philosophy and pedagogy there in 1878. In 1896 he succeeded Eduard Zeller as professor of moral philosophy at Berlin.

He was the greatest of the pupils of Gustav Theodor Fechner, to whose doctrine of panpsychism he gave great prominence by his Einleitung in die Philosophie (1892; 7th ed., 1900; Eng. trans., 1895). He went, however, considerably beyond Fechner in attempting to give an epistemological account of the knowledge of the psychophysical. Admitting Immanuel Kant's hypothesis that by inner sense we are conscious of mental states only, he holds that this consciousness constitutes a knowledge of the thing-in-itself which Kant denies. Soul is, therefore, a practical reality which Paulsen, with Arthur Schopenhauer, regards as known by the act of will. But this will is neither rational desire, unconscious irrational will, nor conscious intelligent will, but an instinct, a will to live (Zielstrebigkeit), often subconscious, pursuing ends, indeed, but without reasoning as to means. This conception of will, though consistent and convenient to the main thesis, must be rigidly distinguished from the ordinary significance of will, i.e. rational desire.

Paulsen is almost better known for his educational writings than as a pure philosopher, including his German Education, Past and Present (Eng. trans., by I. Lorenz, 1907).

Works
Among his other works are: 
Versuch einer Entwickelunggeschichte der Kantischen Erkenntnistheorie (Leipzig, 1875)
Im. Kant (1898, 1899)

 Geschichte des gelehrten Unterrichts auf den deutschen Schulen und Universitäten (1885, 1896)
 System der Ethik (1889, 1899; Eng. trans. [partial] 1899)
 Das Realgymnasium u. d. humanist. Bildung (1889)
 Kant d. Philos. d. Protestantismus (1899)
 Schopenhauer, Hamlet u. Mephistopheles (1900)
 Philosophia militans (1900, 1901)
 Parteipolitik u. Moral (1900)

See also
 German new humanism

Notes

References

External links
 
 fps-niebuell.de 

1846 births
1908 deaths
19th-century educators
19th-century essayists
19th-century German male writers
19th-century German philosophers
20th-century educators
20th-century essayists
20th-century German male writers
20th-century German philosophers
Action theorists
German consciousness researchers and theorists
Continental philosophers
Epistemologists
German ethicists
German humanists
German male essayists
German male non-fiction writers
Humboldt University of Berlin alumni
Academic staff of the Humboldt University of Berlin
Kantian philosophers
Metaphysics writers
Ontologists
Panpsychism
Philosophers of education
Philosophers of literature
Philosophers of mind
Philosophers of war
Philosophy academics
Political philosophers
Rationalists